The 2020 Bulgarian Basketball Cup was the 66th edition of the annual cup tournament in Bulgaria.It is managed by the Bulgarian Basketball Federation and was held in Sofia, in Universiada Hall. The competition started at 6th of February 2020, with the quarterfinals and ended with the Final on February 9, 2020.

Qualified teams
The first eight teams qualified after the first stage of the 2019-20 NBL regular season .

Bracket

Quarterfinals

Semifinals

Finals

References

Bulgarian Basketball Cup
Cup